Theodosius (4 August 583/585 – after 27 November 602) was the eldest son of Byzantine Emperor Maurice (582–602) and was co-emperor from 590 until his deposition and execution during a military revolt. Along with his father-in-law Germanus, he was briefly proposed as successor to Maurice by the troops, but the army eventually favoured Phocas instead. Sent in an abortive mission to secure aid from Sassanid Persia by his father, Theodosius was captured and executed by Phocas's supporters a few days after Maurice. Nevertheless, rumours spread that he had survived the execution, and became popular to the extent that a man who purported to be Theodosius was entertained by the Persians as a pretext for launching a war against Byzantium.

Biography
Theodosius was the first child of Maurice and his wife, the augusta Constantina. He was born on 4 August 583 (according to the contemporary John of Ephesus and other chroniclers) or 585 (according to the later histories of Theophanes the Confessor and Kedrenos). He was the first son to be born to a reigning emperor since Theodosius II in 401, and was accordingly named after him. The papal envoy, or apocrisiarius, to Constantinople, the future Pope Gregory the Great, acted as his godfather. The scholar Evagrius Scholasticus composed a work celebrating Theodosius' birth, for which he was rewarded by Maurice with the rank of consul.

A few years after his birth, possibly in 587, Theodosius was raised to the rank of caesar and thus became his father's heir-apparent. Three years later, on 26 March 590, he was publicly proclaimed as co-emperor.

In late 601 or early February 602, Maurice married Theodosius to a daughter of the patrician Germanus, a leading member of the Byzantine Senate. The historian Theophylact Simocatta, the major chronicler of Maurice's reign, also records that on 2 February 602, Germanus saved Theodosius from harm during food riots in Constantinople.

Later in the same year, during the revolt of the Danubian armies in autumn, Theodosius and his father-in-law were hunting in the outskirts of Constantinople. There they received a letter from the mutinous troops, in which they demanded Maurice's resignation, a redress of their grievances, and offered the crown to either of the two. They presented the letter to Maurice, who rejected the army's demands. The emperor however began suspecting Germanus of playing a part in the revolt. Theodosius promptly informed his father-in-law of this and advised him to hide, and on November 21, Germanus fled first to a local church and then to the Hagia Sophia, seeking sanctuary from the Byzantine emperor's emissaries.

On the very next day however, Maurice and his family and closest associates fled the capital before the advancing rebel army under Phocas, and crossed over to Chalcedon. From there, Theodosius was dispatched along with the praetorian prefect Constantine Lardys to seek the aid of Khosrau II, the ruler of Sassanid Persia. Maurice, however, soon recalled him, and on his return Theodosius fell into the hands of Phocas' men and was executed at Chalcedon. His father and younger brothers had been executed a few days earlier on November 27.

Theory of survival and pseudo-Theodosius
Subsequently, rumours of Theodosius's survival spread far and wide. It was alleged that his father-in-law Germanus had bribed his executioner, a leading Phocas supporter named Alexander, to spare his life. In this story, Theodosius then fled, eventually reaching Lazica, where he died. Theophylact Simocatta reports that he thoroughly investigated these rumours and found them false. Modern historian Paul Speck, however, argues that doubts about the genuineness of Theodosius only began to be expressed late in the reign of Heraclius.

The general Narses, who rose against Phocas in Mesopotamia, exploited the rumours about Theodosius. He produced a man claiming to be Theodosius and then presented him to Khosrau II. The Persian ruler, in turn, used him as a pretext for his own invasion of Byzantium, claiming that it was done in order to avenge the murder of Maurice and his family and place the "rightful" heir Theodosius on the throne. According to the Khuzistan Chronicle, he even had Theodosius re-crowned as Roman emperor by the Nestorian patriarch Sabrisho I in a ceremony in Ctesiphon. In the Armenian campaign of 606–7, the pretender accompanied the commander Ashtat Yeztayar. His presence convinced the garrison of Theodosiopolis (Erzurum) to surrender. 

James Howard-Johnston disputes the identification of this Theodosius as a pretender, arguing that such claims were Roman propaganda and that it is unlikely that both the people of Edessa in 603 and the notables of Theodosiopolis who met him in 608 would have been deceived by an impostor.

Coinage
Theodosius does not appear on most of the regular coinage of Maurice's reign, with two exceptions: the copper nummi of the Cherson mint, which show him along with his father and mother, and a special silver siliqua issue (apparently cut in 591/592 to celebrate his proclamation as co-emperor) from the Carthage mint.

Notes

References

Citations

Sources 

 
 
 
 
 
 
 

Justinian dynasty
580s births
602 deaths
6th-century Byzantine emperors
7th-century Byzantine emperors
7th-century executions by the Byzantine Empire
7th-century murdered monarchs
Caesars (heirs apparent)
Byzantine junior emperors
Executed Byzantine people
Executed monarchs
Leaders ousted by a coup
Maurice (emperor)
People of the Roman–Sasanian Wars
Sons of Byzantine emperors